Tortang kalabasa, also known as squash fritters, is a Filipino omelette made by mixing mashed or finely-grated pumpkin (calabaza) with flour, water, egg, salt, and pepper. Other ingredients like minced vegetables can also be added. It is very similar to okoy, but the latter is made with glutinous rice batter rather than eggs. Regardless it is sometimes known as squash okoy or okoy na kalabasa.

See also

Tortang talong
Tortang sardinas
Tortang carne norte
Poqui poqui

References

External links

Omelettes
Philippine cuisine